Elizabeth Caylee Milne (born 11 December 1990) is a New Zealand association football player who last played for Adelaide United in the Australian W-League. She has also represented her country.

Milne was a member of the New Zealand squad in the 2008 FIFA U-20 Women's World Cup playing all 3 group games; a 2–3 loss to Nigeria, a 4–3 win over hosts Chile and a 1–1 draw with England. In 2010, she represented New Zealand at the 2010 FIFA U-20 Women's World Cup in Germany, appearing in one group game.

Milne made her senior Football Ferns debut in a 0–6 loss to China on 10 January 2009

References

External links

1990 births
Living people
New Zealand women's international footballers
New Zealand women's association footballers
Perth Glory FC (A-League Women) players
Adelaide United FC (A-League Women) players
A-League Women players
Women's association football defenders
Ottawa Fury (women) players
USL W-League (1995–2015) players
New Zealand expatriate sportspeople in Canada
Expatriate women's soccer players in Canada